John M. Burns (born 1938) is an English comics artist, with a career stretching back to the mid-1960s.

Biography 
His initial work was as an illustrator for Junior Express and School Friend. During the 1960s, Burns worked on TV Century 21 and its sister magazines, including the Space Family Robinson series in Lady Penelope.

For a while he drew daily comics strips for newspapers The Daily Sketch, The Daily Mirror and The Sun, including The Seekers, Danielle and, for a period succeeding Enrique Romero during 1978–79, Modesty Blaise.

He moved on to illustrate TV tie-in strips for Look-in, always scripted by Angus Allan. He also worked on the title story for Countdown.

Burns was already well known by the start of the 1980s, but it was when he made the crossover to 2000 AD (along with fellow Look-in alumni Jim Baikie and Arthur Ranson) that his position in British comics was cemented.

In 1991 Burns began by working on Judge Dredd.  By his own admission, Burns does not enjoy drawing science fiction strips, and the look of Judge Dredd is one that he finds particularly unpleasant to draw.

In 2007, Burns began working on the Nikolai Dante strip. He has also co-created (with Robbie Morrison) a contemporary adventure strip — The Bendatti Vendetta, for the Judge Dredd Megazine; this is unique for the title in having no science fiction or fantasy elements at all.

in 2008, he finished an adaptation of Charlotte Brontë's Jane Eyre, whose script was rendered by Amy Corzine, for UK publisher Classical Comics. He previously worked on similar adaptions of Lorna Doone by R. D. Blackmore and, Wuthering Heights by Brontë's sister Emily.

Bibliography

Judge Dredd:
 "Garbage Disposal" (with Garth Ennis, in 2000 AD No. 738, 1991)
 "Twilight's Last Gleaming" (with Garth Ennis, in 2000 AD #754–756, 1991)
 "Raider" (with Garth Ennis, in 2000 AD #810–814, 1992)
 "Part Exchange" (with Dan Abnett, in 2000 AD No. 903, 1994)
 "Revenge of the Chief Judge's Man" (with John Wagner, in 2000 AD #1342–1349, 2003)
 "Bite Fight!" (with John Smith, in Judge Dredd Megazine #224–225, 2004)
Black Light: "Survivor Syndrome" (with Dan Abnett/Steve White, in 2000 AD #1001–1005, 1996)
Penthouse Comix:
 "Abducted by Aliens" (with Eliot R. Brown/George Caragonne/Buzz Dixon, in Penthouse Comix #17–20, 1996–1997)
 "Zheena: Deadlier Than The Male"  (with Ian Edginton, in Penthouse Comix No. 26, 1997)
Nikolai Dante (with Robbie Morrison):
 "Cruel Seas" (in 2000 AD #1148–1149, 1999)
 "Requiem for Lost Love" (in 2000 AD #1150, 1999)
 "Rudinshtein Irregulars " (in 2000 AD #1183–1190, 2000)
 "Love and War" (in 2000 AD #1200–1207, 2000)
 "One Last Night in the House of Sin" (in 2000 AD prog 2001, 2000)
 "The Romanov Empire" (in 2000 AD #1250–1262, 2001)
 "Hell and High Water" (in 2000 AD prog 2003 & #1322–1328, 2002–2003)
 "The Sea Falcon" (in 2000 AD prog 2004, 2003)
 "Agent of Destruction" (in 2000 AD prog 2005 & #1420–1427, 2004–2005)
 "How could you believe me when I said I loved you when you know I've been a liar all my life?" (in 2000 AD #1428–1431, 2005)
 "Primal Screams" (in 2000 AD #1433–1436, 2005)
 "Devil's Deal" (in 2000 AD prog 2006, 2005)
 "Usurper" (in 2000 AD #1487–1489, 2006)
 "The Depths" (in 2000 AD #1500–1501, 2006)
 "Dragon's Island" (in 2000 AD #1502–1507, 2006)
 "The Road of Bones" (in 2000 AD prog 2007, 2006)
 "Deadlier than the Male" (in 2000 AD #1518–1520, 2007)
 "The Beast of Rudinshtein" (in 2000 AD #1532–1535, 2007)
 "The Dissenter" (in 2000 AD #1537, 2007)
 "The Chaperone" (in 2000 AD #1560–1564, 2007)
 "Destiny's Child" (in 2000 AD prog 2008, 2007)
 "The Tsar's Daughter" (in 2000 AD #1578–1580, 2008)
 "Prisoner of the Tzar" (in 2000 AD #1612-1616, 2008)
 "Bring me the Head of Nikolai Dante" (in 2000 AD prog 2009)
 "Hero of the Revolution" (in 2000 AD, prog 2010, #1666-1675, 2010)
 "The Master of Krondstadt" (in "2000 AD", #1705-1708)
 "The Dante Gambit" (in "2000 AD", #1774-1779)
The Scarlet Apocrypha: "Necrocultura" (with Dan Abnett, in Judge Dredd Megazine #4.12, 2002)
The Bendatti Vendetta (with Robbie Morrison):
 "The Bendatti Vendetta" (in Judge Dredd Megazine #4.13–18, 2002)
 "Blooded" (in Judge Dredd Megazine #209–211, 2003)
 "See Naples and Die" (in Judge Dredd Megazine #234–236, 2005)
Jane Eyre (adapted by Amy Corzine, 144 pages, Classical Comics, Spring 2008)

Interviews 
 Ark #28 (1989)
 Judge Dredd Megazine Meg 224 (2004)
 True Brit (Twomorrows Publishing, 2004)
 Vworp Vworp Vol. 3 (2007)

Notes

References
 2000 AD profile
 John Burns data FFF 

1938 births
English comics artists
Living people
Peter O'Donnell